Harry Pratt may refer to:
 Harry H. Pratt (1864–1932), U.S. Representative from New York
 Harry Rogers Pratt (1886–1956), professor of music and drama

See also
 Harry Pratt Judson (1849–1927), U.S. educator and historian
 Harriet Barnes Pratt (1878-1969), American philanthropist and horticulturist
 Henry Pratt (disambiguation)
 Harold Pratt (disambiguation)